Half Girlfriend is an Indian Hindi-language romantic drama film based on the novel of the same name written by Chetan Bhagat. The film is directed by Mohit Suri and stars Arjun Kapoor and Shraddha Kapoor in lead roles.
The film also places Vikrant Massey and Rhea Chakraborty in pivotal roles. 

Principal photography commenced in June 2016 and filming locations include Delhi, Mumbai, Patna, Dumraon, Varanasi, New York City and Cape Town. The film was released worldwide on 19 May 2017.

Plot
 
Madhav is a good basketball player who cannot speak English well. He gets accepted into St Stephen's College Delhi based on a sports quota where he meets Riya Somani, an upper-class young girl who is allowed temporary admission based on a sports quota. They become good friends and play basketball every evening. When Madhav tells his roommate Shailesh and friends about Riya, they push him to ask Riya out for a date, but she refuses and asks him just to be a friend. Madhav's friends still encourage him to pursue Riya in the hopes that she will eventually date him.

One night Madhav and Riya hang out together. Madhav picks her up from her house, and after spending the evening together, when she returns home, she kisses Madhav before entering her house.

When Madhav attends Riya's birthday, he questions her about the nature of their relationship. Uncomfortable, Riya says that she is not his girlfriend, but they can maybe reach a compromise since they have reached halfway, and she offers to be his "Half Girlfriend." One afternoon after a game Madhav asks Riya if she would like to rest in his room in a boys only dorm, where (goaded by his peers and feeling humiliated by Riya's uncertainty) Madhav tries to force himself upon Riya. Upset and hurt, a few days later, Riya tells Madhav that she is leaving college and getting married. Madhav tries to stop her but she leaves.

After completing college, Madhav goes back to his village where Madhav's mother runs a school where only boys study because there are no girls' toilets. Madhav learns that Bill Gates is coming to Patna and will be funding grants to schools. Madhav decides to apply for a grant, for which he goes to Chanakya hotel in Patna.

After the meeting, Madhav meets Riya, who is living in the hotel and works for Closeup. They hang out for some time, and Madhav learns that Riya has divorced because her husband and his mother tried to beat her. As Madhav needs to give a speech in English for Bill Gates, Riya helps him prepare for it. One day, he takes her to his house, where Madhav's mother asks her about her marriage. She acts rudely after discovering that she is a divorcee. A few days before the speech, when Riya has to go back to Patna, Madhav's mother asks her to stay away from Madhav. She, however, attends Madhav's speech, where he is successful in getting a grant from the Bill Gates Foundation. After the speech had ended, a small girl from the school hands a letter from Riya to Madhav. The letter says  that Riya has been diagnosed with blood cancer and will die in three months. She requests him not to search for her as she herself does not know where she will go. Madhav is seen going to Riya's house to deliver her belongings to her mother, who starts crying on learning about Riya's disease. Madhav recalls that she wanted to become a singer at a bar in New York. Unprepared, Madhav goes to New York to visit his friend Shailesh.

Shailesh and his wife Rutvi learn about the incident and try to deviate Madhav's attention from Riya. Rutvi tries to set him up with Anshika, her friend. They spend some time together. Madhav tries to find Riya for three months continuously, until his time runs out. 
On the last day, when he was attending his farewell party, he sees a video where Anshika, who had fallen in love with him, thanks him for being a part of her life. In this video, Madhav sees a blurred picture of Riya singing in a cafe. He runs to the café and finds Riya. They reconcile and consummate their relationship. Riya explains she had lied to Madhav about being sick as his mother didn't want Riya, a divorcee to be with her son.

A few years later, Madhav is seen talking to his mother about opening a new school, and Riya helps their daughter learn to play basketball, but she is unable to do it. Riya tells her daughter never to give up.

Cast
 Arjun Kapoor as Madhav Jha, a Bihari boy who hardly knows to speak English and ends up attracted towards Riya Somani.
 Shraddha Kapoor as Riya Somani, a rich Delhi girl who comes from an entrepreneur background. A singer, she loves to enjoy her own company and sings at a bar in New York.
 Vikrant Massey as Shailesh Khanna, Madhav's colleague who is protective of him.
 Rhea Chakraborty as Anshika Patel, who loves Madhav but lets him go for Riya.
 Seema Biswas as Rani Sahiba, Madhav's Mother, who runs a school in Bihar.
 Shree Dhar Dubey as Hemant the estate agent.
  Anisa Butt as Rutvi, Sailesh's Wife
 Jiten Lalwani as Basketball Coach
 Adam Davenport as Bar Owner in New York City, USA
 Dalip Sondhi as Mr. Somani/Riya's Father
 Sujata Sehgal as Mrs. Somani/Riya's Mother
  Tvisha Shah as Tvisha Jha/Daughter of Riya and Madhav
 Kashvi Kothari as Shabnam/a village girl
 Vikas B Mandaliya as Rohan Chandak/Riya's ex-husband

Additionally, a digitally superimposed likeness of Bill Gates appears in the movie in scenes where he comes to visit Madhav's village in Bihar.

Production
The film went into production in March 2016. Prominent shooting locations included St. Stephen's College in New Delhi and Times Square and the UN Headquarters in New York City. It is the first Bollywood movie to be shot at the UN headquarters. The basketball action in the film is by Rob Miller, NBA and the ReelSports team. Around 200 students from different colleges were roped in to play extras as some of the scenes demand Delhi University students in the film. The trailer was released on 10 April.

Box office
The film was released on 20 May 2017 worldwide. The film collected ₹120 million on its opening day and  ₹104 million on second day. On its first weekend, the total collection was noted as ₹320 million. On its second weekend, the total collection of the film stood at ₹540 million. Its lifetime worldwide gross is estimated to be 86–90 crore, with 72–77 crore earned domestically and 13–14 crore outside India.

Soundtrack

Awards and nominations

References

External links
 
 Half Girlfriend at Bollywood Hungama

2017 films
Films shot in New York (state)
Films shot in Delhi
Films shot in Bihar
Films based on Indian novels
Films set in New York (state)
Films set in Delhi
Films set in Bihar
Indian films set in New York City
2010s Hindi-language films
Indian romantic drama films
Indian coming-of-age films
Films scored by Mithoon
Balaji Motion Pictures films
Films directed by Mohit Suri
2017 romantic drama films